Turberville, sometimes Turbervile, is an English surname derived from a French toponymic. Two prominent ancient English families of this name existed: Turberville of Coity Castle in Glamorgan and Turberville of Bere Regis in Dorset. Notable people with the surname include:

Arthur Stanley Turberville (1888–1945)
Edward Turberville (c. 1648–1681)
George Turberville (c. 1540–before 1597)
Henry de Trubleville otherwise de Turberville (died 1239), English soldier, Seneschal  of Gascony
James Turberville (died c.1570), English bishop

See also
Thomas Hardy's novel Tess of the d'Urbervilles, in which the d'Urberville family was based on the mediaeval Turberville family of Bere Regis, Dorset
Turberville v Stampe (1697), English tort law case
 Tuberville (disambiguation)